Connor Lawes (born July 14, 1996) is a Canadian curler from Sundridge, Ontario. He currently plays third on Team Pat Ferris.

Career
Lawes played for skip Tanner Horgan and represented Northern Ontario at the 2015 Canadian Junior Curling Championships, finishing out of playoffs with a 6–5 record. He has also played for the Queen's Golden Gaels and the Wilfrid Laurier Golden Hawks.

With skip John Willsey, Lawes won the Stroud Sleeman Cash Spiel and the Huron ReproGraphics Oil Heritage Classic during the 2018–19 curling season. The team also competed in the 2020 Ontario Tankard, finishing the round robin with a 4–4 record.

In mixed doubles, Lawes competed at the 2014 Canadian Mixed Doubles Curling Trials, finishing with a 4–3 record and out of the championship pool.

Personal life
Lawes is the nephew of two-time Olympic champion curler Kaitlyn Lawes. Lawes works as an administrative clerk with the Government of Ontario and lives in Kirkland Lake, Ontario.

References

External links

Living people
Canadian male curlers
Curlers from Simcoe County
Queen's Golden Gaels players
Wilfrid Laurier Golden Hawks players
People from Parry Sound District
1996 births
Sportspeople from North Bay, Ontario
Sportspeople from Collingwood, Ontario
Sportspeople from Kirkland Lake